Henry Hardin Cherry (November 16, 1864 – August 1, 1937) was a leader in Kentucky higher education from the late nineteenth through early twentieth centuries. He was an active voice in the movement to establish normal schools in Kentucky and is best known as the founding president of Western Kentucky University. As a charismatic figure, he held a great amount of influence in Kentucky educational reform and politics, serving two times as the president of the Kentucky Education Association.

References

External links
 Henry Hardin Cherry of Bowling Green, Kentucky.

1864 births
1937 deaths
People from Warren County, Kentucky
Heads of universities and colleges in the United States
Western Kentucky University people